Goniobranchus bombayanus is a species of colourful sea slug, a dorid nudibranch, a marine gastropod mollusc in the family Chromodorididae.

Distribution
This species was described from Bombay, India. It occurs in the Gulf of Bengal off northeast India and the Andaman Islands.

Description
Goniobranchus bombayanus is a chromodorid nudibranch with a translucent white mantle with rounded purple spots and an orange submarginal band of coalescent spots. The centre of the back has a brownish hue and the surface is raised into tiny white papillae. The body reaches a length of 30 mm. It is very similar to Goniobranchus kitae.

References

Chromodorididae
Gastropods described in 1946